Ciudad Madero is a coastal city, located in southeast Tamaulipas in the Gulf of Mexico. It is the seventh most populous city in the state, with a census-estimated 2015 population of 209,175 within an area of 18.0 square miles (46.6 km2) the city is the third-largest in the Tampico metropolitan area. It is also an important center of oil refining in Mexico.

Ciudad Madero has a beach named "Playa Miramar", which, in recent years, has been expanding its services with new hotels and restaurants.  Near the beach there is a lighthouse, named "Faro de Ciudad Madero" - although this has been replaced by a red beacon light atop a small tower, to guide approaching ships in to the channel of the Río Pánuco. However, in October 2006, the Ciudad Madero Planning Commission signaled its intention to build a new lighthouse because of the cultural and tourist values it would provide.

References
Link to tables of population data from Census of 2005 INEGI: Instituto Nacional de Estadística, Geografía e Informática
Tamaulipas Enciclopedia de los Municipios de México

External links
Ayuntamiento de Ciudad Madero Official website

Populated places in Tamaulipas
Port cities and towns of the Mexican Gulf Coast